The College Street Historic District is a historic district in Troy, Alabama.  The district encompasses West College Street between Pine Street and Cherry Street.  The district covers 15.5 acres (6.3 ha) and comprises 19 contributing properties, including 17 houses, a church, and a cemetery.  Buildings in the 2-block area date from as early as the 1870s, although some houses were built off of older homes.  The district contains only one house built since the 1920s, keeping intact the historic character of the neighborhood.  Architectural styles include Second Empire, Late Victorian, Queen Anne, and Greek Revival. The district was added to the National Register of Historic Places on August 13, 1976.

References

National Register of Historic Places in Pike County, Alabama
Historic districts in Pike County, Alabama
Historic districts on the National Register of Historic Places in Alabama